The 1930 New South Wales Rugby Football League premiership was the twenty-third season of Sydney's top-level rugby league competition, Australia's first. During the season, which lasted from April until October, eight teams from across the city contested the premiership which was won by Western Suburbs, who defeated St. George in the grand final.

Season summary
In spite of the reduced number of clubs 1930 was the NSWRFL's most drawn out season. Because of representative fixtures and the need for a grand final, the season did not end until 4 October. The 1930 season was also the last in the NSWRFL for future Australian Rugby League Hall of Fame inductee, Jim Craig.

Teams
Foundation club Glebe was voted out of the competition by the New South Wales Rugby League General Committee at the end of 1929, thirteen votes to twelve. Glebe had come second-last or third-last with eight points excluding those from byes three seasons in a row, but although the club never won a first grade premiership, it also managed to avoid the wooden spoon every season during its existence. After the decision was made, many fans and local politicians rallied to reverse the decision but to no avail. One reason suggested as to why this occurred include the fact that Glebe was gradually shifting away from a residential to industrial centre, with the NSWRFL perhaps believing that there was no future for the game in the area.

As a result of Glebe's omission, the competition was reduced to eight teams for the first time since 1910, including six of the remaining nine foundation clubs.

 Balmain, formed on 23 January 1908 at Balmain Town Hall
 Eastern Suburbs, formed on 24 January 1908 at Paddington Town Hall
 Newtown, formed on 14 January 1908
 North Sydney, formed on 7 February 1908
 South Sydney, formed on 17 January 1908 at Redfern Town Hall
 St. George, formed on 8 November 1920 at Kogarah School of Arts
 Western Suburbs, formed on 4 February 1908
 University, formed in 1919 at Sydney University

Ladder

Finals
In the two semi finals, St. George beat second-placed Eastern Suburbs whilst minor premiers Western Suburbs beat defending premiers South Sydney. The two winners then played a final in which St. George upset Western Suburbs 14–6, as they previously did in Round 11.

The finals system set in place then forced the final to be replayed, in what was known as the "Right of Challenge". This system ensured that in the event that the minor premiers lost in either the first or second round of the finals, then regardless they would be given a second chance in a premiership decider. With this being the first season where the "Right of Challenge" was exercised, the 1930 decider was thus the first "grand final" played in the NSWRFL.

Final

Having pipped Eastern Suburbs 11–10 at their home ground of Earl Park on 20 September, Saints continued their good form into the following weekend in the final, defeating minor premiers Western Suburbs 14–6 in front of 16,557 people. The two teams had met twice before during the season with Wests winning the first encounter in May and St. George winning the second match in August. Under the previous system, victory in the final would have seen St. George declared premiership champions. However, in 1930, Wests were allowed a second chance as minor premiers if defeated during the finals.

Grand final
The re-match decider was played in front of 12,178 people on 4 October at the Sydney Sports Ground and officiated by referee Lal Deane. St. George led 2–0 early and competed in the first half. However, Western Suburbs were a crack outfit and after Saints lost veteran forward, Harry Flower with an arm injury, they skipped away to a 16–2 lead. Wests eventually ran in seven tries and crushed St. George 27–2 to take away their first ever NSWRFL premiership in any grade, although they were one of the foundation clubs in 1908.

It was the final game as a player for Wests’ captain-coach and versatile representative star Jim Craig.

Western Suburbs 27 (Tries: Alan Brady 3, Jim Craig, Charlie Cornwell, Ray Morris, Cecil Rhodes. Goals: Jim Craig 2, Bill Brogan)

St. George 2 (Goals: Bill Hyland)

Notes

References

External links
 Rugby League Tables - Notes AFL Tables
 Rugby League Tables - Season 1930 AFL Tables
 Premiership History and Statistics RL1908
 Results: 1921-30 at rabbitohs.com.au

New South Wales Rugby League premiership
NSWRFL season